Fehring is a municipality in the district of Südoststeiermark in Styria, Austria. The landscape is rolling hills cut by the valley of the Raab. Fehring is on a socket some metres above the valley floor. The town is bordered to the east by Burgenland.

Neighbouring municipalities 
 In the north: Johnsdorf-Brunn and Hohenbrugg-Weinberg
 In the east: Sankt Martin an der Raab and Mühldorf
 In the south: Kapfenstein
 In the west: Pertlstein

Community structure 
The municipality Fehring consists of the villages Hirtzenrigel, Höflach, Petzelsdorf, Petersdorf and Schiefer.

History 
The first mention of Fehring is with 40 homesteads in a document from Ottokar of 1265th. The district Petzelsdorf is already mentioned in the Babenberger Urbar 1220th. Fehring was founded as a marketplace and Rudolf IV, Duke of Austria awarded the market law. A parish has been documented in Fehring since 1305.

There have been a lot of wars and fights around Fehring, therefore a tabor was built in the 15th century.

Transportation 

Coat of arms 
King Ferdinand granted arms in Augsburg at 8 July 1550.

Twin towns   
 Heinersreuth
 Patsch

References 

Cities and towns in Südoststeiermark District